The Formula Toyota was a spec racing series in Japan between 1991 and 2007. Many Japanese Formula One drivers, like Kazuki Nakajima and Toranosuke Takagi, made their racing debut in the Formula Toyota. The class folded after the 2007 season when it was effectively replaced by the Formula Challenge Japan.

History

The Formula Toyota held its inaugural race in 1990, this race was won by Masami Kageyama. Toyota launched their first Formula 3 engine in 1991 and won both the drivers title and engine title in the 1991 Japanese Formula Three Championship.  Together with their Formula 3 engine Toyota launched their own racing class, Formula Toyota. The first generation car, the Argo-Tom's FT10, uses an aluminium monocoque. The car was powered by a Toyota 4A-GE engine, which produced 140hp. The FT10 was used until 1994 when it was replaced by a Tom's built FT20. This car was powered by a 5-valve engine, replacing the previous 4-valve engine. In 1995 the Formula Toyota Racing School was founded and the best driver from each class won a fully funded drive in the Formula Toyota championship. Between 1991 and 1999 there were two Formula Toyota championships, Main and West. But after the fields became smaller Toyota merged the two classes into one class for the 2000 season. The championships last race was on November 25, 2007 at Fuji International Speedway. The race was won by Italian-Japanese driver Kei Cozzolino. Team Le Beauset was the most successful team in Formula Toyota, their drivers won the championship six times.

The series folded after the creation of the Formula Challenge Japan. Nissan, Honda and Toyota joined forces and created this racing class in 2006. The Formula Challenge Japan was replaced by the Japan Formula 4 after the 2013 season. In New Zealand the Toyota Racing Series, also known as Formula Toyota, currently uses a Tatuus built Toyota FT40. There is no relationship between the Japanese series and this one except the use of Toyota engines.

Champions

Other notable drivers
 Toranosuke Takagi, Formula 1 driver for Tyrrell in 1998 and Arrows in 1999 
 Takashi Kogure, Super GT and Formula Nippon driver
 Hiroki Yoshimoto, former GP2 Series driver and WTCC driver
 Kohei Hirate, former GP2 Series driver and former test driver for Toyota Racing
 Keisuke Kunimoto, winner of the 2008 Macau Grand Prix Formula Three race
 Yuji Kunimoto, 2010 All-Japan Formula Three champion
 Takuto Iguchi, Super GT GT300 driver

References

External links
 Official website

 
Auto racing series in Japan
Formula racing
Formula racing series
Recurring sporting events established in 1990
Recurring sporting events disestablished in 2007
1990 establishments in Japan
2007 disestablishments in Japan
Defunct auto racing series